Glen Mitchel Brown James (born 16 July 1981), nicknamed "El Depredador" (The Predator), is a Honduran professional footballer.

Club career
A much-travelled forward, Brown has played in Italy, Guatemala, Slovakia and China along with his native Honduras.

His first goal was against Universidad playing for F.C. Motagua and after scoring he was expelled for taking off his shirt. He joined Qingdao Jonoon in 2008. He scored his first goal on the club on April 9, 2008.

China
Brown signed a contract with Hunan Billows in February 2010. He made his China League One debut for Hunan against Shenyang Dongjin on 3 April. Brown scored his first goal for the club on his fourth appearance, in a 2–1 home win against Shanghai East Asia on 22 April. In the 2010 league season, Brown was the top scorer of the club. He scored 7 goals in 19 appearances and won a new contract of the club. In January 2011, Costa Rican club L.D. Alajuelense was reported to be interested in Brown but a deal never materialized.

Brown finished the 2011 league season with the League One top scorer, scored 13 goals in 20 appearances, which shared with Johnny Woodly.

In August 2012, while playing for Marathón, Brown was involved in an incident in which Motagua goalkeeper Kerpo de León was critically injured and a committee summoned an investigation.

International career
He made his debut for the national side on February 6, 2008 in a friendly against Paraguay, coming on as a substitute for Carlos Costly.

Honours

Clubs
Honduran League: 2
 2007 Apertura, 2009 Apertura (Marathón),

 Runner-up with Victoria: 2006 Clausura
 Runner-up with Suchitepequez:
 Promotion with Suchitepequez

Individual
China League One top scorer: 2011

Notes

References

External links

1981 births
Living people
People from La Ceiba
Association football forwards
Honduran footballers
Honduras international footballers
Brescia Calcio players
C.D. Suchitepéquez players
F.C. Motagua players
C.D. Victoria players
C.D. Marathón players
1. FC Tatran Prešov players
Qingdao Hainiu F.C. (1990) players
Hunan Billows players
Liga Nacional de Fútbol Profesional de Honduras players
Honduran expatriate footballers
Expatriate footballers in Italy
Expatriate footballers in Guatemala
Expatriate footballers in Slovakia
Expatriate footballers in China
Honduran expatriate sportspeople in China
Honduran expatriate sportspeople in Italy
Honduran expatriate sportspeople in Slovakia
Honduran expatriate sportspeople in Guatemala
2013 Copa Centroamericana players
Chinese Super League players
Slovak Super Liga players
China League One players